The Metropolitan Cathedral of Our Lady Mother of God also called Catedral Metropolitana de Porto Alegre is a cathedral of the Catholic Church which is located in the city center, in the Praça da Matriz in Porto Alegre a town in the State of Rio Grande do Sul in Brazil.

The story of the founding of the parish of Our Lady Mother of God is closely related to the origin of the city of Porto Alegre. With the transfer of the state capital of Viamão to Porto dos Casais, it became clear the need to build a new church, with dimensions corresponding to the new status of the city. On July 12, 1772, the viceroy ordered that land for the construction demarcate.

This Baroque style cathedral was designed by an unknown architect and has two bell towers flanking the main entrance. These towers were brought from Rio de Janeiro in 1774.

The current cathedral was built in 1921–1972.

See also
 Roman Catholic Archdiocese of Porto Alegre
Roman Catholicism in Brazil
Metropolitan cathedral (disambiguation)

References

Roman Catholic cathedrals in Rio Grande do Sul
Buildings and structures in Porto Alegre
Roman Catholic churches completed in 1972
Church buildings with domes
20th-century Roman Catholic church buildings in Brazil